Noah Oliver Williams (born 15 May 2000) is an English diver who represents Great Britain and specialises in the 10 metre platform event. He has won silver medals in the 10 metre synchro platform with Matthew Dixon at the European Championships and the Commonwealth Games.

Early life
Williams is from Hoxton in Hackney, London.  He was about nine when he first tried diving – while at school, he saw a leaflet from Crystal Palace Diving seeking talent and went to try out the sport, and was accepted. He received support from Hackney's Youth Sports Fund and won the Hackney Sports Awards for six years. He now trains at the London Aquatics Centre.

Career
Williams started diving competitively in 2011 in the ASA National Skills competition, and also competed in the National Age Group Diving Championships in 2013.  He won his first national title in 2015 in Group B 3 metre Springboard event, and won a bronze in the 3 metre synchro in his European debut. In 2016, he won the British Junior Elite Platform, and won another bronze at the European Junior Championships in the same event.  He was also part of the team that won gold in World Junior Championships.

2017
In 2017,  he partnered with Matthew Dixon in the men's synchronized 10 metre platform in the FINA Grand Prix event in held in Gatineau, Canada, and won a gold medal. He also competed in the 10 metre platform at the European Juniors in Bergen, Norway, and won a silver medal behind his diving partner Matthew Dixon. The duo also won a silver in the 10 metre synchro.

At the 2017 European Diving Championships, Williams and Dixon won their first senior international title, gaining a bronze in the 10 metre platform synchro.

2018–2019
At the 2018 Commonwealth Games held in the Gold Coast, Australia, Williams again partnered with Matthew Dixon in the men's synchronised 10 metre platform. They won the silver medal behind fellow GB divers Tom Daley and Daniel Goodfellow with a score of 399.99 points.  He finished just outside the medal positions in fourth in the 10m Platform.

In 2018, at the World Junior Diving Championships in Kyiv, Williams and Dixon won the silver medal in the platform synchro.  The duo then won another silver at the 2018 European Championships in Glasgow/Edinburgh in the Men's 10 m synchro platform.

Williams made his World Championship debut at the 2019 World Aquatics Championships held in Gwangju, South Korea, he finished fourth with Robyn Birch in the mixed 10m platform synchro event, and won qualification for the 2020 Olympics GB team. At the 2019 European Diving Championships held in Kyiv, Williams won silver in the Mixed 10 m platform synchro with Eden Cheng, a bronze in Men's 3m synchro with Dixon, as well as in the team event.

2020–2022
In March 2020, Williams won his first individual international title at the first event of the 2020 FINA Diving World Series which was held in Montreal, Canada, winning gold in the Men's 10m Platform.

In May 2021, Williams and Andrea Spendolini-Sirieix won a silver medal in the 10m mixed synchro event at the 2020 European Aquatics Championships.

Williams qualified for the Olympic Games in Tokyo 2021, however, he missed out on the Men's 10 metre platform semifinal after finishing 27th.

In February 2022, Williams won the gold medal in the Men's 10m Platform event at the British National Diving Cup with a score of 448.50.

At the 2022 World Aquatics Championships held in Budapest, Williams partnered with Matty Lee for the first time in an international competition and they won silver in the synchro 10 m platform event.

At the 2022 Commonwealth Games, Williams and Lee won gold in the synchro 10m platform despite Williams injuring his ankle. Williams also won gold with in the mixed synchro 10m platform with Spendolini-Sirieix. Williams also won a silver at the 2022 European Aquatics Championships in the men's 10m platform final.

References

External links

 
 
 
 
 
 

2000 births
Living people
English male divers
People from Hoxton
Olympic divers of Great Britain
Divers at the 2020 Summer Olympics
Commonwealth Games medallists in diving
Commonwealth Games gold medallists for England
Commonwealth Games silver medallists for England
Divers at the 2018 Commonwealth Games
Divers at the 2022 Commonwealth Games
European Games competitors for Great Britain
Sportspeople from London
World Aquatics Championships medalists in diving
21st-century British people
Medallists at the 2018 Commonwealth Games
Medallists at the 2022 Commonwealth Games